Sale is an administrative ward in the Ngorongoro District of the Arusha Region of Tanzania. In 2016 the Tanzania National Bureau of Statistics report there were 4,892 people in the ward, from 4,384 in 2012.

References

Wards of Arusha Region